Katelyn Cox (born 1 June 1998) is an Australian rules footballer playing for the Richmond Football Club in the AFL Women's (AFLW). Cox was drafted by Richmond with their third selection and sixtieth overall in the 2022 AFL Women's draft. She made her debut against  at GMHBA Stadium in the first round of AFL Women's season seven.

Statistics
Statistics are correct to end S7 (2022)

|- style="background-color: #eaeaea"
! scope="row" style="text-align:center" | S7 (2022)
|style="text-align:center;"|
| 17  || 12 || 1|| 0 || 54 || 17 || 71 || 10 || 33 || 0.1 || 0.0 || 4.5 || 1.4 || 5.9 || 0.8 || 2.8
|- 
|- class="sortbottom"
! colspan=3| Career
! 12
! 1
! 0
! 54
! 17
! 71
! 10
! 33
! 0.1
! 0.0
! 4.5
! 1.4
! 5.9
! 0.8
! 2.8
|}

References

External links

1998 births
Living people
Richmond Football Club (AFLW) players